Gʻijduvon District is a district of Bukhara Region in Uzbekistan. The capital lies at the city Gʻijduvon. Until 2018, when it became part of Konimex District (Navoiy Region), the town Zafarobod was part of the Gʻijduvon District.

The district consists of 1 city (Gʻijduvon), 13 urban-type settlements (Abadi, Beshtuvo, Gajdumak, Jovgari, Koʻlijabbor, Mazragan, Yuqori Rostgoʻy, Oʻzanon, Xatcha, Chagʻdari, Dodarak, Namatgaron, Yuqori Qumoq) and 14 rural communities.

References

Bukhara Region
Districts of Uzbekistan